Ricardo Lancaster-Jones y Verea, MA BE KHS (9 February 1905 – 20 January 1983) was a Mexican historian, diplomat, scholar, professor, art collector and sugarcane entrepreneur who made significant contributions toward the study of the haciendas of the State of Jalisco (Mexico) in the twentieth century. He spoke Spanish, English, French, Italian and Latin fluently. He authored and published numerous articles for newspapers and specialized magazines in Mexico, South America, Spain, United Kingdom and United States. His enthusiasm for history led him to become a professor of Regional History at the Faculty of Philosophy and Letters of Universidad Autónoma de Guadalajara in 1965. Later on, in 1973, he earned his MA degree in Latin American Studies at the University of New Mexico. He is especially mentioned by Mexican academics Mauricio Beuchot (2001)  and José María Murià (2003) as an early historian of the haciendas in Western Mexico.

Biographical notes
His published biographical notes were written by:
  (1972) Lucien F. Lajoie (1916–1988), an American author who published Who is Who in Mexico.
  (1983) Raquel Moreno Pérez, a Guadalajaran journalist who published ¿Quién fue el Ingeniero Ricardo Lancaster-Jones?, Boletín del Archivo Histórico de Jalisco.
  (1983) Luis Sandoval Godoy (1927), a journalist and historian from Teúl de González Ortega, Zacatecas that lives in Guadalajara published Ricardo Lancaster-Jones y Verea at Estudios Históricos magazine.
  (1984) Gabriel Agraz García de Alba (1926–2009) authored Evocación de Ricardo Lancaster-Jones y Verea, an essay published by the Academia Mexicana de Genealogía y Heráldica.
  (1985) Fernando Muñoz Altea (1925–2018), a distinguish Spanish historian and journalist who wrote some biographical and genealogical notes in his article Lancaster-Jones.
  (1986) Ramiro Villaseñor y Villaseñor (1911–1991) added bibliographical references about Lancaster-Jones in his books: Las Calles Históricas de Guadalajara. and Bibliografía General de Jalisco (1990).
  (1988) José Jorge Vázquez-Tagle (1925–1998) added new biographical and genealogical information in his paper, Los Lancaster-Jones.

Since 2005 his name has been listed among the Illustrious People (Personajes Ilustres) of the State of Jalisco at its official webpage as: Ricardo Lancaster Jones y Verea (1905–1983). Ingeniero, diplomático, catedrático.

The Congress of the State of Jalisco has published some biographical notes about Ricardo Lancaster-Jones y Verea in 2010.

Family and early life

Mexican author Carlos Monsiváis, in his book Amor Perdido (2005), mentions the Lancaster-Jones family among the Porfiriato's distinguished families in the dawn of Mexico's 20th century.

Ricardo Lancaster-Jones y Verea born in Guadalajara, Jalisco (the second largest city in Mexico) to Alberto Lancaster-Jones y Mijares and Isabel Verea y Vallarta. Through Spanish historian Fernando Muñoz Altea (1925–2018) and local journalist José Jorge Vázquez-Tagle, it is possible to trace Lancaster-Jones y Verea's immediate and extended family. His father, Alberto Lancaster-Jones y Mijares (1873–1958) MEng KHS, was a  British-Mexican sugarcane entrepreneur and scientist. He was Chairman of the Board of Ingenio Santa Cruz y El Cortijo (a sugar refinery located in Zapotiltic, Jalisco); in 1919 he cofounded the Instituto de Ciencias in Guadalajara, being his first Director (1919–1934). Fourteen years later, in 1934, he founded the Faculty of Chemical Sciences at the Universidad Autónoma de Guadalajara, being its first Dean (1934–1958). On 5 March 1986, the lecture hall No. 9 of such Faculty of Chemical Sciences was named as Ing. Alberto Lancaster-Jones y Mijares to honour his memory.

Alberto Lancaster-Jones y Mijares' parents were: Ricardo Lancaster-Jones (1831–1922), a British-Mexican banker and entrepreneur (grandson of the English innovator on public education Joseph Lancaster), Mayor of Guadalajara and Treasurer of the State of Jalisco; and Francisca Mijares y Añorga (great-granddaughter of the 8th Señor De Añorga in San Sebastián, Gipuzkoa, Basque region of Spain). Through his extended family, Alberto Lancaster-Jones y Mijares was nephew of: A) Alfonso Lancaster-Jones (1842–1903), a British-Mexican jurist, politician and Mexico's Ambassador to the UK (1836–1909). B) José Antonio Pintó y Añorga, 1st Count de Añorga in Spain. C) Catalina Barron y Añorga, who married Antonio de Escandón y Garmendia (1824–1877) KHS, Spanish-Mexican entrepreneur who introduced the railroad in Mexico. D) Dolores Barron y Añorga, who married General Pedro Rincón Gallardo y Rosso (1836–1909), Mexican Ambassador to Russia and Germany. E) Guillermo Barron y Añorga (1829–1903), British-Mexican entrepreneur, Chairman of the Board of Barron, Forbes & Co.

Isabel Verea y Vallarta's parents were: José María Verea y González de Hermosillo (1826–1884), Mexican jurist and author of the State of Jalisco's Ley de Enjuiciamiento Civil (1872); and Isabel Vallarta y Ogazón. Through her extended family, Isabel Verea y Vallarta was niece of: A) Count Francisco de Paula Verea y González de Hermosillo (1813–1884), Pope Pius IX's Domestic Prelate (1862); he was one of the Mexican delegates to the First Vatican Council (1869–1870), and Bishop of the dioceses of Nuevo León and Puebla. B) Pedro Ogazón Rubio (1824–1890), Mexican jurist, politician and military; Minister of War, Governor of the State of Jalisco  and President of Mexico's Supreme Court of Justice of the Nation. C) Ignacio Luis Vallarta Ogazón (1830–1893), Mexican jurist and politician; Minister of Interior, Governor of the State of Jalisco and President of Mexico's Supreme Court of Justice of the Nation. D) Bernardo Reyes Ogazón (1850–1913), Mexican military and politician; Minister of War and Governor of the State of Nuevo León.

Ricardo Lancaster-Jones y Verea was nephew of Alfonso Reyes (1889–1959), Mexican man-of-letters, poet, philosopher and Mexico's Ambassador to Argentina and Brazil; and cousin of: A) Manuel Sandoval Vallarta (1899–1977), a Mexican physicist co-author of the Lemaître-Vallartas theory about the cosmic rays' effects on earth. B) Elena Verea y Corcuera, married with Carlos Alfonso de Mitjans, 21st Count of Teba (1907–1997), Grandee of Spain.Alamo, Angel; "Bunting, El Conde de Teba: Memorias de una Leyenda", published by Jacobo Fitz James Stuart, Madrid, 2000, p. 25 C) Sofía Verea y Corcuera, married with Ignacio Bernal (1910–1992), an eminent Mexican anthropologist and archaeologist. D) Marta Verea y Corcuera, married with Francisco Pérez de Salazar y Solana, distinguished Mexican connoisseur.Verea de Pérez de Salazar, Marta; "Las Familias Verea y Abellón, Vallarta y Villaseñor, González de Hermosillo y Jiménez de Castro, Ogazón y Velásquez Delgado", author's edition, Mexico City, 2002, pp. 12-20, 45-48, 70, et al.

Ricardo Lancaster-Jones y Verea's early life passed between Guadalajara, Mexico City (where his paternal grandfather lived) and his family's Hacienda of Santa Cruz y El Cortijo (located in Zapotiltic, Jalisco), where he enjoyed exploring the countryside, horseback riding, hunting, swimming and fishing. This fact influenced him some years later when he became interested in the history of Jalisco's haciendas. When he turned 27 years old, he was asked to choose  Citizenship (he could have taken British nationality owing to his father's citizenship), but chose Mexican nationality by a document dated on 29 September 1932.

Early studies and occupation

Ricardo Lancaster-Jones y Verea studied in Mexico (Instituto de Ciencias and Escuela Libre de Ingenieros, both in Guadalajara), and in the United States (St Charles College, Grand Coteau, Louisiana and the University of Dayton, Ohio). He earned a Topographical Engineering degree at the Escuela Libre de Ingenieros de Jalisco (1928) and a Bachelor of Engineering (BE) degree at the University of Dayton (1929).

As the eldest child of his family, he entered the sugarcane business in 1930 at the already mentioned Ingenio Santa Cruz y El Cortijo, where he made important contributions until  1942. In 1944, he became a member of the board of directors of Ingenio Tamazula (a sugar refinery located in Tamazula de Gordiano, Jalisco). In 1946, he was founding member of Sociedad de Ingenieros y Arquitectos de Guadalajara (Engineers and Architects Society of Guadalajara) serving as general manager since 1949. Then, in 1950 he became a member of the board of directors of Banco Industrial de Jalisco.

Contributing journalist
Beginning in 1934, Lancaster-Jones wrote for the Gaceta de Guadalajara magazine, later becoming a contributing journalist for the El Informador newspaper. He continued writing for different magazines and newspapers from Guadalajara and Mexico City, such as Crónica Social Tapatía, El Mundo, Estudios Históricos, Excelsior, El Occidental, et al.

Marriage
In Guadalajara, on 28 October 1935, Ricardo Lancaster-Jones married Luz Padilla y España (5 April 1913 – 5 March 1978); the wedding reception was held at the Verea y Vallarta's mansion in Guadalajara (nowadays, this building is the seat of the Congress of Jalisco). On 18 February 1955, Luz Padilla y España was named Dame of the Equestrian Order of the Holy Sepulchre of Jerusalem.León de la Barra, Luis; "Ordenes y Honores Pontificios en México", 1957, p. 28

Luz Padilla y España was the eldest child of Arcadio Padilla y Romo de Vivar, and of Guadalupe España y Araujo.

Arcadio Padilla y Romo de Vivar was a well-known Guadalajaran attorney-at-law who also was Mexico's National Railroads representative in Mexico City (1920–1935), and the State of Jalisco's Senior Deputy to Mexico's National Congress (1928–1930).Aguirre, Amado; "Memorias de Campaña", Instituto Nacional de Estudios Históricos de la Revolución Mexicana, México, 1985, p. 153

Guadalupe España y Araujo was granddaughter of José María Araujo, a Guadalajaran attorney-at-law, District Judge and Knight of the Imperial Order of Guadalupe (27 February 1865)."Anuario de las Ordenes Imperiales 1865, J.M. Lara press, Mexico City, 1865, pp. 3, 14

Through her extended family, Luz Padilla y España was niece of: A) Carmen Padilla y Romo de Vivar, wife of the Guadalajaran academic and painter José Vizcarra (1874–1956). B) Sara España y Araujo, wife of Alfredo Navarro Branca (1881–1979), a famous Guadalajaran architect from post-revolutionary period; nowadays, among his buildings, the one of the Universidad de Guadalajara (1914) stands out.

Diplomat
During the course of his life, Lancaster-Jones participated in some diplomatic activities with the United States, El Salvador, the United Nations and the Holy See:

Consulate of the United States

  1945: he was appointed as Advisor for Cultural Affairs to the United States consulate in Guadalajara.

Consulate of El Salvador
  1946: he was appointed as Consul of the Republic of El Salvador (1946–69) in Guadalajara.

United Nations Delegate
  1950: he was named as United Nations' Delegate to the State of Jalisco. From 1953 to 1960, he was Secretary General of its Regional Committee.

Order of the Holy Sepulchre
  1950–52: he organized, along with Cardinal Jose Garibi y Rivera, the Nueva Galicia's Chapter (Intendencia de Nueva Galicia) of the Equestrian Order of the Holy Sepulchre of Jerusalem and served as its first General Secretary since 1952.

Asociación Consular de Guadalajara
  1950: he was co-founder and third President (1958–66) of the Asociación Consular de Guadalajara (Consular Association of Guadalajara). During his presidency the city of Guadalajara became a sister city of Downey, California on 26 August 1960. The following year, he was named vice-president of the first Reunión Nacional de Cónsules, celebrated 18–20 November 1961, Veracruz, México.

Historian
Lancaster-Jones was included by Luis González y González among the notable historians of the second half of the 20th century in Mexico (1973).

Collaborations
During the course of his life, he contributed with such authors as:

 José Cornejo Franco in his book Introducción del agua a Guadalajara (1942), by sharing a document from his private collection that was dated on 4 February 1792; a document that demonstrated the efforts made until such date with the purpose of give water supply to the city of Guadalajara.
 François Chevalier in his book La formation des grands domaines au Mexique, terre et société aux XVIe-XVIIe siècles (1952), sharing information about the rural estates of Jalisco.
 José López-Portillo y Weber (father of Mexico's President José López Portillo) in his book Cristóbal de Oñate: Historia Novelada (1955), by writing an introduction about the López-Portillo family's background, and the author's biography.
 Manuel Romero de Terreros, in his book Antiguas Haciendas de México (1956), shared information and images about the Hacienda de Santa Ana Apacueco.
 Rogers McVaugh in his books Edward Palmer: plant explorer of the American West (1956) and Flora Novo-Galiciana (1983), by providing access to relevant data to the botanical history of Jalisco.Gray Memorial Botanical Association, The Asa Gray Bulletin, University of Michigan, Botanical Gardens Association, Michigan Botanical Club, volumes 1-2, 1953, p. 388
 Gabriel Agraz García de Alba in his book, Jalisco y sus Hombres: compendio de geografía, historia y biografía jaliscienses (1958), for whom he wrote an introduction and shared information about illustrious people from Jalisco.
 Jean Meyer by sharing information and documents about Manuel Lozada and some other information about the Cristero War for Meyer's publications about those subjects (1973, 1984).Meyer, Jean; "Esperando a Lozada", El Colegio de Michoacán, 1984, p. 200
 Doris M. Ladd, in her 1974 book, The Mexican nobility at independence, 1780–1826, by sharing information about the Porres-Baranda family and the first Mayorazgo in Guadalajara, Jalisco.
 Isaac Antonio Bonilla by giving him advice on the archives of Guadalajara for his book, Documentos para la historia de California relating to José Mariano Bonilla (1976).
 José Ignacio Dávila Garibi (a nephew of the Mexican prelate, Cardinal José Garibi y Rivera) in his work, Apuntes para la historia de la Iglesia en Guadalajara (1977), contributing with documents and information.
 Ramón María Serrera Contreras during his investigation for his book Guadalajara Ganadera. Estudio Regional Novohispano, 1760–1805 (1977), by sharing information about the rural estates of Jalisco.
 Patricia Arias in her book Guadalajara, la gran ciudad de la pequeña Industria (1985), by giving her an interview and sharing some documents on the history of Guadalajara's growth and development.
 Sir Edgar Vaughan in his book Joseph Lancaster en Caracas (1824–1827) (1989), by sharing family information, as a descendant of the notable English innovator and educationist Joseph Lancaster.
 Alfonso de la Madrid Castro (uncle of Mexico's President Miguel de la Madrid) in his work Apuntes históricos sobre Colima: siglos XVI-XX, by giving him many information about Jalisco's archives that had documents related to the State of Colima, an essay that was published many years after De la Madrid's death by José Miguel Romero de Solís in 1998.

In 1954, Lancaster-Jones gave more than a dozen photos to Paul Alexander Bartlett, depicting the haciendas Santa Cruz and El Cortijo (Jalisco) from 1880 to 1940, contributing to Bartlett's large-scale study of more than 350 haciendas throughout Mexico that Bartlett conducted between 1943 and 1985. Nowadays, these photographs are kept in the Benson Latin American Collection at the University of Texas at Austin.

Museo Regional de Guadalajara
In 1952 the Governor of the State of Jalisco, José Jesús González Gallo (1900–1957), appointed Lancaster-Jones as Curator of the Museo Regional de Guadalajara, serving this post until 31 December 1953.Moreno Pérez, Raquel; "¿Quién fue el Ingeniero Ricardo Lancaster-Jones?", Boletín del Archivo Histórico de Jalisco, volumes 1-2, Guadalajara, 1983, p. 22. During the two years he was in office, he reorganized the exhibition rooms, commanded the restoration of priceless works of art, and made a detailed inventory of the various museum collections.

Major contributions

1941 – Documents of Our Lady of Zapopan. According to a published speech given by Lancaster-Jones in 1970 for the unveiling ceremony of the sculpture of Friar Antonio de Segovia (1500–1570), he located the original documents which validate the authenticity of the image that is venerated at the Basilica of Our Lady of Zapopan (documents which date from 16th to 18th centuries). Those were secreted for safe keeping by Friar Luis de Palacio y Basave (1868–1941) in the early 20th century during the religious persecution that happened after the Mexican Revolution and caused the Cristero War. In 1941, the friar's heirs asked Lancaster-Jones to make an appraisal of the friar's library. He found those important documents and purchased them from Friar Palacio's heirs; later on, he gave those documents, as a gift, to Dr Jose Garibi y Rivera who was Archbishop of the Archdiocese of Guadalajara in those days. Lancaster-Jones was inspired by those documents to write his work Tríptico Mariano, first published in 1948.
1947 – Francisco Márquez's Baptismal Certificate. The discovery of Francisco Márquez's Baptismal Certificate in Guadalajara helped to rewrite Márquez's biography. He was one of the Niños Heroes who died at the Battle of Chapultepec during the Mexican–American War. Márquez's early years remained a mystery until then. Through this fact, it can be proved that Márquez was actually born in Guadalajara and the real date of his birth was 8 October 1834. He was baptized nine days later, on 18 October, as Francisco de Borja Jesús Benito, his godparents were his maternal grandparents: Gerónimo Paniagua y María Prudencia Falcón. Through a Confirmation Certificate (also found by Lancaster-Jones), it can be proved that Márquez moved to Mexico City and the reason why he joined the army: his Confirmation's godparents where his mother Micaela Paniagua and the General Leonardo Márquez. His widowed mother remarried, to Francisco Ortiz, a cavalry captain, by the time Márquez joined the Heroico Colegio Militar on 14 January 1847. In 1970, Mexican historian Ricardo Covarrubias have credited to Lancaster-Jones for such discovery at his work Las Calles de Monterrey. Since 2005, Márquez has been listed among the Illustrious People (Personajes Ilustres) of the State of Jalisco at its official webpage.
1949 – Domingo Lazaro de Arregui's papers of intestate. Two articles published by Lancaster-Jones in the newspaper El Informador (23 October 1949 and 5 March 1950) helped to form an accurate biography of Domingo Lazaro de Arregui, who wrote the earliest geographical description of former Kingdom of Nueva Galicia (Descripción de la Nueva Galicia, 1621). Guadalajaran academic José María Muriá claims this fact helped French historian François Chevalier to rewrite De Arregui's biography on his prominary study for the second edition (1980) of  his work Descripción de la Nueva Galicia, (the first one was published in Seville, 1946).

1951 – Origin of the name of Los Altos region. In his published work La Hacienda de Santa Ana Apacueco (1951), Lancaster-Jones refers a land grant document  issued in 1606 naming Jalisco's high lands as Los Altos de Villanueva. Therefore, historians whose especial interest is the after mentioned region like Mariano González-Leal, have credited to Lancaster-Jones for the discovery of the origin of such name of Los Altos.Pérez Ortiz, César; "Etnografía situacional de la Memoria Histórica en la Región de los Altos de Jalisco", Universidad de Guadalajara, Guadalajara, 2008, p. 1.
1953 – Contributions with The Church of Jesus Christ of Latter-day Saints. According to Genealogical Journal, Ricardo Lancaster-Jones y Verea had a vital part by contributing with the Church of Jesus Christ of Latter-day Saints (LDS Church) and the Academia Mexicana de Genealogía y Heráldica, during the microfilming process of the complete and well preserved Archdiocese of Guadalajara's parochial records (1953–71). A copy of these microfilms are located in the Archivo General de la Nación (in Mexico City).
1958 – Francisco Primo de Verdad y Ramos' Baptismal Certificate. The discovery of Francisco Primo de Verdad y Ramos' Baptismal Certificate in the hacienda of Ciénega del Rincón, located in the current Municipality of Lagos de Moreno in the State of Jalisco. Until then, Primo de Verdad was thought to be from Aguascalientes. Through this, his correct birthplace was ascertained. Two years later, in 1960, Primo de Verdad's full name was inscribed with gold at the main hall of the Congress of the State of Jalisco. Since 2005, Francisco Primo de Verdad y Ramos has been listed among the Illustrious People (Personajes Ilustres) of the State of Jalisco at its official webpage.
1974 – Haciendas de Jalisco'''. His important archive of documents related to the rural history of the former Kingdom of New Galicia in the Viceroyalty of New Spain is reflected in his most well-known book, Haciendas de Jalisco y Aledaños (1506–1821), which was published in 1974 being the first publication in its kind in Western Mexico, and the most complete essay about the haciendas of Jalisco and their development since the early 16th century until Mexico's Independence (1821).

Scholar
Ricardo Lancaster-Jones y Verea's published works gave him an important role in Mexico's cultural circles and abroad:
  1949: He founded – along with Salvador Gutiérrez Contreras – the Sociedad de Amigos de Compostela and was its General Secretary.
  1953: He contributed with the establishment of the Sociedad Oaxaqueña de Genealogía y Heráldica, being its Honorary President.
  1955: He contributed with the establishment of the Sociedad de Amigos de Tecolotlán, being its General Secretary.
  1956: The Instituto Internacional de Genealogía y Heráldica (an international institution based in Madrid), appointed him as the Instituto's Advisor and Delegate to Mexico.
  1957: The Accademia Universitaria Internazionale (an international institution based in Rome), appointed him as president for the Mexican Chapter.
  1972: The American International Academy (an institution based in New York City) appointed him as member of the Academic Council and the Academy's Delegate to Mexico.
  1974: The Augustan Society appointed him as Member of the Executive Council and Advisory Committee.

Academia Mexicana de Genealogía y Heráldica
 1948: He entered to the Academia Mexicana de Genealogía y Heráldica as a supernumerary. Since then, most of his essays on genealogy and heraldry were published in the Academia's Memorias; among others, La Familia Añorga y sus ramas de México (1949) stands out due to the extensive iconographic research on the families: Añorga, Barron, Escandón and Mijares. This study provide new facts to Captain José de Añorga's biography: he was the first Director of San Blas' shipyards, and the Port's Governor; this place became very important because the New Spain's explorations to North America's Pacific Coast departed from there.
 1954: He became a numerary member with seat #21 and was appointed by Academia's president, José Ignacio Dávila Galibi, as Academia's Delegate to the State of Jalisco.

Academia de Genealogía y Heráldica Mota-Padilla

 1950–53: He reorganized the Academia de Genealogía y Heráldica Mota-Padilla, being its President (1950–83). He has been praised by the academic Ramiro Ordoñez Jonama (former Vice Minister of Foreign Affairs of Guatemala) regarding his work by giving continuity to this institution.

Sociedad Mexicana de Geografía y Estadística
 1950–57: He was General Secretary of the Junta Auxiliar Jalisciense (Jalisco's Chapter) of the Sociedad Mexicana de Geografía y Estadística.

Universidad Autónoma de Guadalajara
In 1965 Antonio Leaño Álvarez del Castillo (1913–2010), Rector and Chairman of the Board of Universidad Autónoma de Guadalajara, appointed Ricardo Lancaster-Jones as professor of regional history at the Faculty of Philosophy and Letters.Moreno Pérez, Raquel; "¿Quién fue el Ingeniero Ricardo Lancaster-Jones?", Boletín del Archivo Histórico de Jalisco, volumes 1-2, Guadalajara, 1983, p. 24.

University of New Mexico
In 1973 Lancaster-Jones earned his M.A. in Latin American Studies at University of New Mexico with the thesis Haciendas de Jalisco y aledños: fincas rústicas de antaño, 1506–1821 (published in Mexico the next year as Haciendas de Jalisco y Aledaños (1506-1821)). Then, he continued with the PhD studies under the guidance of Donald C. Cutter (1922–2014), emeritus professor of history at University of New Mexico from 1976 until 1978, then, his health broke down. After he recovered his health in late 1978, he didn't continued with the PhD degree due to personal reasons.

Disciples
Another noted disciple of Lancaster-Jones was Áurea Zafra Oropeza (died 11 August 2010, Guadalajara), among whose publications are Agustín Rivera y Agustín de la Rosa ante la filosofía novohispana (Sociedad Jalisciense de Filosofía, Guadalajara, 1994) and Las cofradías de Cocula (Agata, Guadalajara, 1996). Her La mujer en la historia de Jalisco was awarded in 1996 by the Government of the State of Jalisco.

Connoisseur
According to Leopoldo I. Orendain (1898–1972), Ricardo Lancaster-Jones y Verea was a "real Connoisseur" whose enthusiasm as an art collector brought him to become advisor to several governors of Jalisco and various businessmen who sought for his help during the formation of their own collections of art. He was also a referee in testamentary appraisals. Lancaster-Jones was the first person, since 1948, to question the authenticity of a group of six paintings elaborated on copper sheet, attributed to Rubens and that are in the collection of the Basilica of Our Lady of San Juan de los Lagos (Jalisco).

José Cornejo Franco (1900–1977), Director of the Public Library of the State of Jalisco (1949–1977), avers that Lancaster-Jones collaborated with the formation of several private libraries and contributed with the reorganization of the Public Library of the State of Jalisco (1950–1959). In 1970 the restoration of the former Franciscan convent of Guadalajara owed to his work El Uso de Documentos en la Restauración de Edificios Antiguos (Use of Documents in the Restoration of old Buildings). This study was published the year before (1969), through it, he examines an inventory from 1718 of the same Franciscan convent (a manuscript of his own collection). Anticipating to his times as thirty years had to pass and so in the year 2000, the Escuela de Conservación y Restauración de Occidente (School of Conservation and Restoration of the West) was founded in Guadalajara.

Art collector
When Ricardo Lancaster-Jones y Verea's paternal grandfather died in 1922, he inherited an important collection of Mexican Colonial Art (pieces from the Viceroyalty of New Spain period), a collection which was increased through time with more pieces from the Colonial period as well as from Mexican 19th century. His art collection also included some selected pieces from 20th century's artists like Chucho Reyes (1880–1977), José Clemente Orozco (1883–1949) and Jorge González Camarena (1908–1980). He is mentioned among the most important art collectors in the State of Jalisco by Xavier Torres Ladrón de Guevara (1997).

Guadalajaran art collector Carlos Navarro gives remarkable importance to his oil painting portrait collection in his book El Retrato en Jalisco (2004). This collection included works from artists like: José María Estrada (1764–1860), Juan Cordero (1822–1884), Pablo Valdéz (1839–1898), Felipe Castro (1832–1902), Jacobo Gálvez (1821–1882), Gerardo Suárez (1834–1870), José Pamplona (1845–1867), Carlos Villaseñor (1849–1920) and José Vizcarra (1874–1956).

Booklover
Lancaster-Jones is mentioned by Ramiro Villaseñor y Villaseñor as one of the notable booklovers of Jalisco. His library had more than 35,000 volumes, most of them collected through the course of his life. Nowadays, those volumes are distributed among the libraries of El Colegio de Jalisco, the University of Texas and the University of New Mexico, as well as in private collections in Mexico and abroad.

Ex Libris
His bookplate was catalogued in 1970 by the Mexican academic José Miguel Quintana (1908–1987) in Libros Mexicanos; it was designed by the artist and academic Carlos Stahl (1892–1984). Nowadays, one of Ricardo Lancaster-Jones' bookplates can be found at the Colección de ex-libris de Guillermo Tovar de Teresa (Guillermo Tovar de Teresa's Bookplates Collection) at the Universidad Iberoamericana in Mexico City.

Sociedad de Anticuarios de Guadalajara
In 1953 Lancaster-Jones established the Sociedad de Anticuarios de Guadalajara (Society of Antiquarians of Guadalajara), serving as General Secretary from 1953 to 1980.

View on the history of Jalisco's haciendas

According to Ricardo Lancaster-Jones y Verea: an hacienda in all its types: plantations, mines, business factories, etc., was the medium that made possible the population of large dispersed areas (sometimes isolated); it was the base of the acculturation process and the core around which the incorporation to civilized life by the indigenous took place.
Given the extension of the territory of New Spain (now Mexico), the haciendas became excellent autonomous centers. Their inhabitants lived in a microcosm that allowed them to channel their spiritual and material needs.

The haciendas that existed in the ancient Kingdom of New Galicia were located through a diverse and rich geography. Local circumstances changed the regional customs in the haciendas of this area, distinguishing them from the rest of New Spain. The origin of the features that distinguish Mexico in the world today: charreria, mariachi and tequila, can be found in the Haciendas of Jalisco.Sandoval Godoy, Luis; "Haciendas", Impre-Jal, Guadalajara, 1986, pp. 189-197

Honours and awards 

Honours

Awards

Major works
Ricardo Lancaster-Jones y Verea is mentioned by Heriberto García Rivas (1971) among the notable authors of the late 20th century in Mexico. As a published author, his name can be found also like: Ricardo Lancaster-Jones or Ing. Ricardo Lancaster-Jones. His publications include:

Bibliography
1951 – El Primer Impreso Tapatío y sus autores1952 – Dos Monografías Jaliscienses1952 – La Biblioteca Jalisciense1961 – Examen de Libros. Imperialista desengañado1970 – Examen de un Libro1981 – La Historia de la Conquista de Francisco López de Gómara1981 – La Marquesa Caldeón de la Barca y su "Vida en México"Biography

1947 – El Acta de Francisco Márquez en Guadalajara1949 – El intestado de Domingo Lázaro de Arregui1949 – Don Manuel de Olasagarre1950 – Don José Luis Verdía y Don Luis Pérez Verdía1950 – Una hija de los Condes de Miravalle, Primera Dama de la República1951 – Un Hijo de D. Nuño de Guzmán1952 – Datos biográficos de Luis Pérez Verdía1952 – Guadalajara y Don Juan Manuel1954 – Una Ilustre Dama Mallorquina en México1955 – El Nacimiento de Maximiliano1956 – Evocación de Juan Salvador Agraz1957 – El Encomendero Martín Monje1958 – El Señor Ingeniero Alberto Lancaster-Jones y Mijares, un Caballero Terciario1958 – Primo de Verdad, Héroe Jalisciense1958 – Primo Verdad, Jalisciense Neto1961 – Un Mexicano Ministro General de la Orden Franciscana1966 – Don Francisco de Paula Verea, Obispo de Linares y de Puebla"Boletin del Instituto de Investigaciones Históricas" de la Universidad Nacional Autónoma de México, No. 24, México, 1988, pp. 27, 37
1970 – Don Juan B. Iguíniz, como historiador de Jalisco y genealogista local1973 – El Acta de Francisco Márquez en Guadalajara (new information)
1974 – Fray Antonio Tello y su Importancia en la Historiografía de Jalisco1976 – Mexicano ilustre en la fundacion de la Academia San Carlos de Valencia1981 – Don Juan B. Iguiniz1981 – El Historiador Agustín Rivera y Sanromán1981 – François Chevalier y su Historia Social1983 – Don Nicolás Carlos Gómez de Cervantes, XV Obispo de GuatemalaDiplomacy and institutions

1952 – La Orden de Caballería del Santo Sepulcro de Jerusalén1953 - Apuntes para la Historia de la Orden Ecuestre del Santo Sepulcro de Jerusalén en México1954 – Honores de Estado1954 – La Orden de Nuestra Señora de San Juan de los Lagos1954 – Investidura de la Orden del Santo Sepulcro1955 – Discurso Pronunciado en la Cena Consular el 24 de Enero de 19551956 – La Academia de Genealogía y Heráldica Mota-Padilla1964 – The Oldest Genealogical and Heraldic Society in Mexico1964 – La Academia de Genealogia y Heradica Mota-Padilla1969 – La Real Academia Sevillana de Buenas LetrasFine arts and architecture
1934 – Anticuarios Tapatíos1939 – Los Rubens de San Juan de los Lagos en entredicho1939 – La Asunción de María en el Arte de la Pintura y la Escultura1939 – La Decoración del Salón del Cabildo Municipal1948 – Tríptico Mariano1950 – La Casa Natal del General Bernardo Reyes1952 – La Miniatura en México1954 – Colecciones de Arte en Guadalajara I (Aurelio G. Hermosillo Brizuela)1955 – Colecciones de Arte en Guadalajara II (Jesús Garibi Velasco)1956 – Dos Retratos Románticos Tapatíos1956 – Iconografía Zapopana1957 – Colecciones de Arte en Guadalajara IV (Luz de la Cruz Castaños)1969 – El uso de documentos en la restauración de edificios1974 – Destellos del Genio Valenciano en Guadalajara, la de MéxicoGenealogy and heraldry
1949 – La Familia Añorga y sus ramas de México1950 – La Familia López-Portillo de la Nueva Galicia y de la Nueva Vizcaya1950 – El Escudo de Miravalle1950 – Genealogía de la familia Vallarta de México1951 – El Orígen de la Familia Miramón1951 – Noticia genealógica sobre las familias Ogazón y Velásquez de la Nueva Galicia1951 – El Linaje de Fr. Luis de Palacio1953 – La Familia Verea de Jalisco1954 – Los estudios Genealógicos y Heráldicos en el Continente Americano1955 – El autor y sus antecedentes de familia (notes on the López-Portillo family)1957 – Notas genealógicas sobre la familia Pérez-Verdía1958 – Suerte Irlandesa (notes on the Barron Añorga family)1960 – Heráldica patronímica neogallega: Híjar1964 – The Oldest Genealogical and Heraldic Society in Mexico1965 – La familia Mijares de Jalisco1966 – A Princely Family of MexicoHaciendas
1951 – La Hacienda de Santa Ana Apacueco1957 – El Primer Mayorazgo Tapatío1958 – Las Haciendas de Santa Cruz del Valle y el Cuatro1973 – Haciendas de Jalisco y aledaños: fincas rústicas de antaño, 1506–18211974 – Haciendas de Jalisco y Aledaños (1506–1821)1981 – Algunas haciendas de JaliscoMonographs

1948 – Compostela de ayer y de hoy1948 – La Iglesia Parroquial de Compostela1948 – Los Vecinos de Compostela en el Siglo XVI1949 – Prólogo (Compostela de Indias)1949 – Un Documento relativo a la Iglesia Parroquial de Compostela1949 – La Batalla de la Mojonera1950 – Una visita Pastoral a Compostela y a Tepic en el Siglo XVIII1952 – La Popularidad de la Independencia Mexicana1953 – Las Tres Basílicas Marianas de Jalisco1955 – Los Tapatíos en el Siglo XVI1958 – El Seminario Tapatío cuna de Cardenales1964 – Los Bienes del Convento Agustino de GuadalajaraZavala, Silvio Arturo; "Revista de Historia de América", Pan American Institute of Geography and History, Issue 59, 1965, pp. 3, 8, 21
1966 – El Sistema de Enseñanza Mutua y la Labor de Grupo1966 – Una Historia Eclesiástica Regional1970 – Fray Antonio de Segovia y Nustra Señora de Zapopan1975 – Introducción a un viaje a la Alta California''

Notes

Main references

References 

 
 
 
 
 
 
 
 
 
 
 
 
 
 
 
 
 
 
 
 
 
 
 
 
 
 
 
 
 
 
 
 
 
 
 
 
 
 
 
 
 
 
 
 
 
 
 
 
 
 
 
 
 
 
 
 
 
 
 
 
 
 
 
 
 
 
 

|

1905 births
1983 deaths
Mexican people of British descent
Mexican art collectors
Mexican diplomats
20th-century Mexican historians
Members of the Order of the Holy Sepulchre
20th-century male writers
Mexican genealogists
Mexican heraldists
St. Charles College (Louisiana) alumni
University of Dayton alumni
Academic staff of Universidad Autónoma de Guadalajara
People from Guadalajara, Jalisco
Historians of Latin America
Historians of Mexico
Recipients of the Papal Lateran Cross
Knights of the Holy Sepulchre